A do is an administrative division in both North and South Korea. Based on the earlier Chinese circuit (whose character it shares), it is equivalent to a province or American state.

Korea

North Korea

South Korea

References